The 1995–96 NBA season was the Nuggets' 20th season in the National Basketball Association, and 29th season as a franchise. During the off-season, the Nuggets acquired top draft pick Antonio McDyess from the Los Angeles Clippers, and acquired Don MacLean and Doug Overton from the Washington Bullets. However, the team got off to a horrible start losing eight of their first nine games, as LaPhonso Ellis missed the first 37 games of the season with a knee injury. Despite the slow start, the Nuggets would then recover winning eight of their next nine games leading to a 9–9 start, but later on lost six straight games in January slipping below .500 with a 20–27 record at the All-Star break.

In March, the Nuggets found themselves in the middle of an ugly controversy as Mahmoud Abdul-Rauf refused to stand for the Star-Spangled Banner, protesting what he felt was the country's poor treatment to Muslims in the world; he was then suspended by the league. After a one-game suspension, Abdul-Rauf agreed to stand and pray during the anthem. However, the damage was done, and his reputation could not be repaired, as he was the consistent target of boos from fans, before missing the remainder of the season with ankle and foot injuries after playing 57 games. The Nuggets finished fourth in the Midwest Division with a 35–47 record, missing the playoffs.

Abdul-Rauf led the Nuggets with 19.2 points and 6.8 assists per game, while McDyess averaged 13.4 points, 7.5 rebounds and 1.5 blocks per game, and was named to the NBA All-Rookie First Team, Dale Ellis finished second on the team in scoring averaging 14.9 points per game, and Dikembe Mutombo provided the team with 11.0 points, 11.8 rebounds and 4.5 blocks per game, and was selected for the 1996 NBA All-Star Game. In addition, Bryant Stith contributed 13.6 points and 1.4 steals per game, while MacLean provided with 11.2 points per game off the bench, LaPhonso Ellis averaged 10.5 points and 7.2 rebounds per game, and second-year guard Jalen Rose contributed 10.0 points and 6.2 assists per game. Mutombo also finished in third place in Defensive Player of the Year voting.

Following the season, Abdul-Rauf was traded to the Sacramento Kings, while Mutombo signed as a free agent with the Atlanta Hawks after five seasons in Denver, Rose and Reggie Williams were both dealt to the Indiana Pacers, and MacLean and Overton both signed with the Philadelphia 76ers.

Draft picks

Roster

Regular season

Season standings

Record vs. opponents

Game log

Player statistics

Regular season

Player Statistics Citation:

Awards, records, and honors
 Antonio McDyess, NBA All-Rookie Team 1st Team

Transactions

References

 Nuggets on Basketball Reference

Denver Nuggets seasons
1995 in sports in Colorado
1996 in sports in Colorado
Denver Nug